Aparna Singh is a Bollywood film writer and director.

Early life
She was born in Jabalpur, Madhya Pradesh. She is an alumnus of National School Of Drama.
She assisted Anurag Kashyap at Black Friday .

Career

She debuted in Bollywood as director of the film Irada, starring Naseeruddin Shah, Divya Dutta, Sharad Kelkar, and Arshad Warsi.
This films concept based on reverse boring and its demerit with sociopolitical drama.

References

External links

Year of birth missing (living people)
Living people
Film directors from Madhya Pradesh
Directors who won the Best Film on Environment Conservation/Preservation National Film Award
National School of Drama alumni